Victor Cromack (17 March 1920 – 1984) was an English professional footballer who played in the Football League for Mansfield Town.

References

1920 births
1984 deaths
English footballers
Association football goalkeepers
English Football League players
Ashfield United F.C. players
Mansfield Town F.C. players